Mutu may refer to:

People
 Adrian Mutu (born 1979), Romanian footballer
 Daniel Mutu (born 1987), Romanian footballer
 Margaret Mutu, New Zealand academic
 Pârvu Mutu (1657–1735), Wallachian Romanian muralist and church painter
 Wangechi Mutu (born 1972), Kenyan-born American visual artist
 Mutu Kapa (1870–1968), New Zealand tribal leader, orator, sportsman and Anglican priest

Other uses
 Mutu language, spoken in Papua New Guinea
 Mutu (music), a type of improvised sung poetry from Sardinia
Surnames of the Democratic Republic of the Congo

Surnames of Romanian origin
Romanian-language surnames